The Beechcraft Starship is a twin-turboprop six- to eight-passenger pressurized business aircraft produced by Beech Aircraft Corporation.

Development

Development of the Starship began in 1979 when Beech decided to explore designs for a successor to its King Air line of turboprops that would fly faster and carry more passengers. The design was originated by Beechcraft in January 1980 as Preliminary Design 330 (PD 330). 
 
On August 25, 1982, Beech contracted with Scaled Composites to refine the design and build an 85% scale proof-of-concept (POC) aircraft. One of the significant changes made to the design by Scaled Composites was the addition of variable geometry to the canard.

The POC aircraft first flew in August 1983.  This aircraft had no pressurization system, no certified avionics, and a different airframe design and material specifications from the planned production Model 2000.  Only one POC was built and it has since been scrapped.

Prototypes were produced even as development work was continuing—a system demanded by the use of composite materials, as the tooling required is very expensive and has to be built for production use from the outset. Beech built three airworthy full-scale prototypes. NC-1 was used for aerodynamic testing and had an ejection seat and was the only Starship equipped with conventional electro-mechanical avionics. NC-2 was used for avionics and systems testing and NC-3 was used for flight management system and powerplant testing. NC-1 first flew on February 15, 1986.

The program was delayed several times, at first due to underestimating the developmental complexity and manufacturing learning curve of the production composite construction, and later due to the technical difficulties of correcting a pitch damping problem and developing the stall-warning system. Starship development cost $300 million. The first production Starship flew on April 25, 1989.

Design 

The Starship is noteworthy for its carbon fiber composite airframe, canard design, lack of centrally located vertical tail, and pusher engine/propeller configuration.

Carbon fiber composite was used to varying degrees on military aircraft, but at the time the Starship was certified, no civilian aircraft certified by the U.S. Federal Aviation Administration had ever used it so extensively. Beech chose carbon fiber composite for its durability and high strength-to-weight ratio. According to Beech, the Starship weighs less than it would have if it were built from aluminum. Nonetheless, the empty weight of production aircraft exceeded the target by several thousand pounds.

Beech studied several configurations before settling on a canard configuration in early 1980. As configured, the Starship is difficult to stall; the forward surface stalls before the main lifting surface, which allows the nose to drop and more-normal flight to resume.

A traditionally located vertical tail would have transmitted propeller noise into the airframe. In its place, directional stability and control is provided by rudders mounted on the winglets. Because of this addition Beechcraft called the winglets "tipsails".

Mounting the engines so that the propellers are facing rearward, pushing rather than pulling the aircraft, is done for the purpose of a quieter cabin, since the propellers are further back from the passengers and because vortices from the propeller tips do not strike the fuselage sides. However, the propellers are operating in a turbulent airflow in the pusher configuration (due to airflow past the wings moving aft in vortex sheets) and high-velocity exhaust gases are discharged directly into the propellers, producing more noise where they are than if the propellers had been in a tractor configuration.

Flight instrumentation for the Starship included a 14-tube Proline 4 AMS-850 "glass cockpit" supplied by Rockwell Collins, the first application of an all-glass cockpit in a business aircraft.

Operational history

Beech sold only eleven Starships in the three years following its certification. Beech attributed the slow sales to the economic slowdown in the late-1980s, the novelty of the Starship, and the tax on luxury items that was in effect in the United States at the time.

However, 
In an effort to stimulate demand, Beech began offering two-year leases on new Starships in 1991.

The last Starship, NC-53, was produced in 1995. In 2003 Beechcraft said that supporting such a small fleet of airplanes was cost-prohibitive and began scrapping and incinerating the aircraft under its control. The aircraft were sent to the Evergreen Air Center located at the Pinal Airpark in Arizona for destruction. Beech worked with owners of privately owned Starships to replace their airplanes with other Beech aircraft such as the Premier I jet.

In 2004, Raytheon sold off its entire inventory of Starship parts to a Starship owner for a fraction of its retail value.

Variants
Model 115
Conceptual 85% scale prototype, one built by Scaled Composites.

Model 2000
Initial production version. 20 produced including three pre-production airworthy prototypes.

Model 2000A
Beech did not serialise the 2000A as a distinct model and it was not issued a new FAA type certificate.

The final 2000A configuration had tuning-fork-type noise dampers and improved insulation to reduce cabin noise and redesigned exhaust stacks for more efficient engine airflow. Stall strips placed on the front wing to enhance stall behavior were removed. The 2000 had standpipes in the fuel tanks to artificially limit fuel capacity so the aircraft would meet a target payload weight.

Beech produced a kit to upgrade serial numbers NC-4 through NC-28 to 2000A specifications.

Aircraft on display

Several Starships have been donated to museums since the decommissioning program began. The Kansas Aviation Museum received the first donated aircraft, NC-41, in August 2003 and the Beechcraft Heritage Museum in Tullahoma, TN, received the second donated aircraft, NC-49, in September 2003. NC-42 was donated to the Museum of Flight in Seattle, WA, and is currently on loan to the Future of Flight at Paine Field in Everett, WA. NC-27 was donated to Evergreen Aviation & Space Museum in McMinnville, Oregon in late 2003 and is currently on static display. NC-23 is on Airline Row at the Pima Air & Space Museum.  NC-6 is on display in Liberal, KS, at the Mid-America Air Museum. Aircraft NC-28 is on display at the Queensland Air Museum, after it was used by the Queensland Institute for Aviation Engineering in Caloundra. Aircraft NC-14 is on display outside at the Southern Museum of Flight.

Surviving aircraft

, nine Starships hold an active registration with the FAA. Three Starships are registered in Oklahoma (NC-29, NC-35 & NC-45), one in Texas (NC-50), one in Colorado (NC-51), and four are registered to Beechcraft in Wichita, Kansas (NC-2, NC-8, NC-19 & NC-24). NC-51 was used as a chase plane during the re-entry phase of Burt Rutan's SpaceShipOne. In October 2008 NC-29 was the first of the five remaining privately owned airworthy Starships to complete RVSM certification, returning the aircraft's service ceiling to the original FL410 limit.

Evergreen Air Center sold 24 Starships back to private owners for $50,000 each. Most are being used for parts; however, one of these aircraft has since been made airworthy again. Some former Starship parts have been used on the Epic turboprop kitplane.

Salt Lake Community College used a Starship in their Aviation Maintenance program until late 2012 when it was sold and scrapped for parts.

As of September 2020, only six Starships remain airworthy. Two of the last remaining airworthy Beechcraft Starships (NC-33 and NC-50) are owned and operated by an engineering firm in Addison, Texas. NC-33 lost its data plate when it was scrapped, was subsequently registered in Mexico, but when brought back to the US, the FAA revoked its certificate.  It is now registered in the experimental category as N903SC. The other airworthy Starships are located in Oklahoma (NC-35 and NC-45), Colorado (NC-51), and Germany (NC-29, though registered with the FAA by a company in Delaware).

Specifications (2000A)

See also

References

Notes

Bibliography

External links

 The Starship Diaries
 A Collection of Beechcraft Starship 2000A Material

Detailed Beechcraft Starship (of aircraft N903SC) walkaround 

Starship
1980s United States business aircraft
Twin-engined pusher aircraft
Low-wing aircraft
Canard aircraft
Twin-engined turboprop aircraft
Engine-over-wing aircraft
Aircraft first flown in 1986